The Madawaska School Department in Madawaska, Maine serves the area of Madawaska, St. David, and Grand Isle.  There are two schools that serve the student population: The Madawaska Elementary School and the Madawaska Middle/High School.

Schools
Madawaska Elementary School
is located at 353 11th Avenue in Madawaska.  Built in 1994, this school serves students from pre-K through 6th grades.

Madawaska Middle/High School
is located at 135 Seventh Avenue in Madawaska.  This school serves students from 7th to 12th grade.  The first section of this school was built in 1940s, with major additions and renovations through the years.

References

External links

School districts in Maine
Education in Aroostook County, Maine